is a Japanese  basketball player who plays for Toyota Antelopes of the Women's Japan Basketball League .  She also plays for Japan women's national 3x3 team. Younger Mawuli led the national U23 3x3 team to World champion in 2019. She became the first-ever player to win both 5x5 and 3x3 medals at Asian Games in 2018.

Personal
She, and her sister Evelyn, both play for the Toyota Antelopes. Her parents were both born in Ghana and emigrated to Japan.

References

External links

1998 births
Living people
Basketball players at the 2018 Asian Games
Japanese people of Ghanaian descent
Sportspeople of Ghanaian descent
Japanese women's basketball players
Sportspeople from Aichi Prefecture
Asian Games medalists in basketball
Asian Games silver medalists for Japan
Asian Games bronze medalists for Japan
Medalists at the 2018 Asian Games
3x3 basketball players at the 2020 Summer Olympics
Olympic 3x3 basketball players of Japan
Japanese women's 3x3 basketball players